Emmanuel-Théodose de La Tour d'Auvergne, cardinal de Bouillon (24 August 1643 – 2 March 1715, Rome) was a French prelate and diplomat.

Biography
Originally known as the Duc d'Albret, he was the son of Frédéric Maurice de La Tour d'Auvergne, Duc de Bouillon and his wife Éléonor de Bergh. He was the nephew of Maréchal de Turenne. As a member of the House of La Tour d'Auvergne, he claimed to be a Foreign Prince.

In 1658, he was appointed a canon of Liège; in 1667 doctor of the Sorbonne. He played some part in Turenne's conversion to Catholicism in 1668 and had an important rôle as intermediary between his uncle and Louis XIV. Created a cardinal in 1669, at the early age of twenty-four, he was provided with several rich benefices. In particular he was made Grand Almoner of France in 1671 and became Supreme Abbot of the Cluniac Order in 1683. On 19 Oct 1689, he was appointed as Cardinal-Bishop of Albano and consecrated on 20 Nov 1689 by Flavio Chigi, Cardinal-Bishop of Porto e Santa Rufina, with Giambattista Rubini, Bishop of Vicenza, and Francesco Juste Giusti, Bishop of Nepi e Sutri, serving as co-consecrators.

His brother Godefroy Maurice de La Tour d'Auvergne was the next Duke of Bouillon. His oldest sister Élisabeth, married Charles III, Duke of Elbeuf, son of Charles II, Duke of Elbeuf and Catherine Henriette de Bourbon. 

Louvois, the powerful minister of Louis XIV, inspired by enmity to the house of Turenne, successfully opposed certain of his demands on the king for the benefit of members of his family, and the cardinal's disappointment vented itself in a bitter satire on his royal master. This was used to effect Bouillon's downfall at court.

He carried out the nuptials between Philippe d'Orléans, Duke of Chartres and Françoise-Marie de Bourbon, Mademoiselle de Blois at Versailles on 18 February 1692. Mademoiselle de Blois was an illegitimate daughter of Louis XIV and Madame de Montespan. Bouillon had previously refused to take part in the marriage of Louise-Françoise de Bourbon, Mademoiselle de Nantes (sister of Mademoiselle de Blois) to the Duke of Bourbon in 1685 and was subsequently exiled then recalled to perform the formal ceremony.

The cardinal then put forth great efforts to obtain the vacant Prince-Bishopric of Liège, but could not overcome the opposition of Louvois, who secured the dignity for Clement Joseph of Bavaria. He eventually regained the royal favour and was sent as ambassador to Rome. While there, Bouillon employed the sculptor Pierre Le Gros to carve the main components of the tomb he planned to erect for his parents at the Abbey of Cluny (the sculptures were finished by 1707 and arrived at Cluny in 1709). Contrary to the wishes of his king, he championed the cause of Fénelon against that of Bossuet and did all he could to prevent the condemnation of Fénelon's Explication des maximes des Saints. 

He was recalled to France, but he hesitated to obey the Royal order since he was next in line for the office of Dean of the Sacred College and consequently Bishop of Ostia (his presence at the time of the imminent death of the current Dean was required to secure his succession). The death of the pope and the subsequent conclave further delayed departure and Bouillon's property in France was then seized. When he eventually submitted and returned to France, he was first exiled to his Abbey of Tournus, soon given a little more freedom of movement, but forbidden to enter Paris. This prevented him from defending himself against the monks of Cluny who sought a parliament ruling against Bouillon's rule over them.

With similar motives in mind as for his tomb project in Cluny, i.e. as contributing factors to a grander scheme of establishing his family as sovereign princes, the cardinal employed Étienne Baluze to compose an Histoire généalogique de la maison d'Auvergne (1708, 2 vols. in fol.), partly based on falsifications. After losing his appeal to uphold his rule over the Cluniac monks in 1710, Bouillon wrote a deeply insulting letter to the king and fled to Prince Eugene of Savoy in the Low Countries.

A warrant for his arrest was issued by the Royal Parliament, and his possessions again confiscated. Only now, because of the dynastic pretensions expressed in them, Baluze's Histoire was banned and the building of the tomb at Cluny prevented. 

Bouillon soon went to take up his residence at Rome, where he spent his last days as a guest of the Jesuits in the Jesuit novitiate at Sant'Andrea al Quirinale, where he was eventually buried.

While bishop, he was the principal consecrator of:
Uldericus Nardi, Bishop of Bagnoregio (1698); 
Giulio Dalla Rosa, Bishop of Borgo San Donnino (1698); and  
Giovanni Francesco Albani, Pope of Rome (1700).

Notes

References
De Feller-Pérennès, Biogr. Gener. (Paris, 1834), II, 470.
Felix Reyssié, Le cardinal de Bouillon (1643–1715), Paris 1899.

1643 births
1715 deaths
18th-century French cardinals
Academic staff of the University of Paris
Cardinal-bishops of Albano
Cardinal-bishops of Ostia
Cardinal-bishops of Porto
Cardinal-bishops of Sabina
Burials at Sant'Andrea al Quirinale
Deans of the College of Cardinals
Grand Chamberlains of France
Ancien Régime office-holders
La Tour d'Auvergne
Dukes of Albret
17th-century French cardinals
Ambassadors of France to the Holy See